Mitrella gracilis is a species of sea snail, a marine gastropod mollusk in the family Columbellidae, the dove snails.

Description
The length of the shell attains 10.6 mm.

Distribution
This marine species occurs off  the Norfolk Ridge, New Caledonia.

References

 Monsecour, K.; Monsecour, D. (2016). Deep-water Columbellidae (Mollusca: Gastropoda) from New Caledonia. in: Héros, V. et al. (Ed.) Tropical Deep-Sea Benthos 29. Mémoires du Muséum national d'Histoire naturelle (1993). 208: 291-362.

External links
 

gracilis
Gastropods described in 2016